Pieve a Bozzone is a village in Tuscany, central Italy, in the comune of Siena, province of Siena. At the time of the 2001 census its population was 28.

Pieve a Bozzone is about 10 km from Siena.

References 

Frazioni of Siena